The Hypocrites is a Chicago storefront theater company founded in 1997 by Sean Graney, Brandon Kruse and Christopher Cintron. The company is currently run by Sean Graney (artistic director) and Kelli Strickland (executive director). One of Chicago’s premier off-Loop theater companies, The Hypocrites specializes in mounting bold productions that challenge preconceptions and redefining the role of the audience through unusual staging (such as promenade and in-the-round) and direct engagement. The company has a reputation in Chicago for creating exciting, surprising, and deeply engaging theater as it re-interprets well-known works for contemporary audiences, reveling in the absurd while revealing the core of what makes classics classic.“The Hypocrites, who with each new production, continue to rise not just to the rank of one of our city’s best storefronts but one of Chicago’s best theaters period.” – Newcity Stage (American Idiot, 2015)The company has grown significantly in the past few years, receiving acclaim for productions at the Steppenwolf Garage, Goodman Theatre, Museum of Contemporary Art, DCASE Storefront, Chopin Theater and nationally at American Repertory Theater (A.R.T.), Berkeley Repertory Theatre, and Actors Theatre of Louisville.

Adaptations 
Their recent production of Graney's All Our Tragic, a twelve-hour adaptation combining all 32 surviving Greek Tragedies, garnered the company six 2015 Equity Jeff Awards in its first year of eligibility.“’A watershed moment for off-Loop theater.” – Chris Jones, Chicago Tribune (All Our Tragic, 2014)Graney's musical adaptations of Gilbert & Sullivan’s Pirates of Penzance, The Mikado and H.M.S. Pinafore have become audience and critic favorites, being remounted numerous times in Chicago as well as going on tour to American Repertory Theater (A.R.T.), Berkeley Repertory Theatre, Actors Theatre of Louisville, and Olney Theater Center.“Cromer calibrates 'Our Town' with clear-eyed intelligence. You see the beauties of small-town America and its limitations, laid out before you as directly and powerfully as the Chicago theater can muster.” – Chris Jones, Chicago Tribune (Our Town, 2008)

Awards 
Since the company's founding, The Hypocrites have produced over sixty main stage productions and a dozen festival pieces, securing thirty-one Non-Equity Joseph Jefferson awards, six Equity Joseph Jefferson awards, and two After Dark Awards.

The American Theatre Wing, best known as the creator of the Tony Awards, presented The Hypocrites with one of the 2013 National Theatre Company awards. The company's smash-hit production of Our Town, directed by David Cromer, transferred in 2009 to Off-Broadway, Los Angeles and Boston.

The Hypocrites began performing in the basement of Café Voltaire, a now defunct vegetarian restaurant in Lakeview. Co-founder Sean Graney has been the artistic director since early 2015, when he announced his return from a three-year hiatus. The company's name is inspired by Eugène Ionesco’s Notes and Counter Notes, a compendium of interviews on the nature of theatre throughout which Ionesco regularly contradicts himself — hence its title, and The Hypocrites' name.

Production history 
Season 1
 The Bald Soprano
 Woyzeck
 Endgame
 Action
Season 2
 Edmond
 The Danube
 The Firebugs
 The Future is in Eggs
 Marat/Sade
Season 3
 Curse of the Starving Class
 Jack, or the Submission & The Future is in Eggs
 The Cherry Orchard
Season 4
 Lakeboat
 Ajax
 The Curious Sofa
 Arcadia
Season 5
 Blood Wedding
 Rhinoceros
 Leviticus 18
 Henry 5
Season 6
 Machinal
 Happy Days
 Balm in Gilead
 Edward Gorey’s Dispirited Diversion for Christmas
Season 7
 Camille/La Traviata
 Leonce & Lena
 The 4th Graders Present an Unnamed Love-Suicide
Season 8
 Equus
 The Christmas Carol – A Radio Broadcast
 The Glass Menagerie
 True West
Season 9
 Death of a Salesman
 4.48 Psychosis
 Angels in America, Part I – Millennium Approaches
 Angels in America, Part II – Perestroika
Season 10
 Cat on a Hot Tin Roof
 Mud
 The Bald Soprano
Season 11
 Desire Under the Elms
 Miss Julie
 Our Town
Season 12
 The Threepenny Opera
 Our Town Remounted
 The Hairy Ape
 Oedipus
Season 13
 Frankenstein
 Cabaret
 No Exit
Season 14
 K.
 Pirates of Penzance
 Woyzeck
Season 15
 Sophocles: Seven Sicknesses
 Pirates of Penzance (Remount)
 Six Characters in Search of an Author
 Romeo Juliet
Season 16
 The Fall of the House of Usher
 Gilbert & Sullivan Repertory
 Coriolanus
 Ivywild: The True Tall Tales of Bathhouse John
Season 17
 12 Nights
 The Mikado at Steppenwolf Garage
 The Tennessee Williams Project
 Into the Woods at Mercury Theatre Chicago
Season 18
 All Our Tragic
 Gilbert and Sullivan Rep: Mikado, Pirates of Penzance and HMS Pinafore
 Endgame
 Three Sisters
Season 19
 American Idiot 
 The 4th Graders Present an Unnamed Love-Suicide
 The Ruffians' Burning Bluebeard
 The Glass Menagerie
 Adding Machine: The Musical 
 Johanna Faustus 
Season 20 
 You on the Moors Now 
 Cinderella at the Theater for Potatoes 
 Wit 
 The House of Martin Guerre 
 Las Meninas

References

External links 
 The Hypocrites Website 

Theatre companies in Chicago
Arts organizations established in 1997